Vastator is a Chilean thrash metal band formed in Santiago in 1986.

Band members

Current members
Sr. Díaz (vocals) (1986–present)
Gerardo Barrenechea (drums) (1986–present)
Criss Nelson (bass and keyboards) (2018–present)
Richard Pilnik (guitar) (2016–present)

Past members
Peyote Barrera (bass) (1986-2018)
Sergio Bustamante (guitar) (1986–2001)
Francisco Gutiérrez (guitar) (2001–2007)

Discography

Albums
Guía Para Odiar a tu Prójimo (1998)
Night of San Juan (2001)
Hell Only Knows (2007)
Machine Hell (2011)
Gentlemen's Club (2019)

Demos
El Profanador (1987)
Inconsciencia Asesina (1988)
Máxima Entropía (1989)

References

Chilean heavy metal musical groups